Azad University Tehran Basketball Club is an Iranian professional basketball club based in Tehran, Iran. They compete in the Iranian Basketball Super League. The club is sponsored by and represents Azad University.

History
Azad University Basketball Club was founded in 1991 in Tehran, Iran and represents in the Islamic Azad University in Tehran. Azad finished in fourth place in the 2011–12 season.

Tournament records

Iranian Super League
 2005–06: 13th place
 2006–07: 11th place
 2007–08: 11th place
 2008–09: 9th place
 2009–10: 5th place
 2010–11: 5th place
 2011–12: 4th place
 2012–13: 6th place

Roster

Notable former players
  Amir Amini
  Asghar Kardoust
  Ejike Ugboaja
  Kevin Sheppard
page on Asia-Basket

Basketball teams in Iran
Basketball teams established in 1991
Sport in Tehran
1991 establishments in Iran